Sok Chanraksmey (born 10 January 1992) is a former Cambodian footballer  who last played for Asia Euro United in the Cambodian League.

International career
He made his senior international debut on 24 March 2013 in a 2014 AFC Challenge Cup qualification match against Philippines. He scored his first international goal in a friendly match against Malaysia. He scored all three goals for his country in 2014 AFF Suzuki Cup qualification match against Timor-Leste which his country came behind to win that match 3-2.

International goals

Honours

Club
Svay Rieng
Cambodian League: 2013
Hun Sen Cup: 2011, 2012
National Defense Ministry
Hun Sen Cup: 2016

Individual
Hun Sen Cup Top scorer: 2008

References

External links

1992 births
Living people
Association football forwards
Cambodian footballers
Cambodia international footballers
Angkor Tiger FC players